Waldenøya (anglicized as Walden Island) is a small, rocky island just north of Nordkapp, Nordaustlandet on Svalbard.  It is the westernmost part of Sjuøyane in the Svaldbard archipelago.

The island is named after John Walden, who was a midshipman aboard the Hon. Constantine John Phipps'  in 1773. Walden, along with two pilots, visited the island on August 5 of the same year during the 1773 Phipps expedition towards the North Pole.

References

Conway, W. M. 1906. No Man's Land: A History of Spitsbergen from Its Discovery in 1596 to the Beginning of the Scientific Exploration of the Country. Cambridge: At the University Press.
 Norwegian Polar Institute: Place names in Norwegian polar areas

Islands of Svalbard